Corey Michael Levin (born August 12, 1994) is an American football guard for the Tennessee Titans of the National Football League (NFL). He was drafted by the Tennessee Titans in the sixth round of the 2017 NFL Draft. Levin played college football at Chattanooga.

Professional career

Tennessee Titans
The Tennessee Titans selected Levin in the sixth round (217th overall) of the 2017 NFL Draft. On May 12, 2017, the Titans signed Levin to a four-year, $2.51 million contract with a signing bonus of $110,014.

On August 31, 2019, Levin was waived by the Titans.

Denver Broncos
On September 1, 2019, Levin was claimed off waivers by the Denver Broncos. He was waived on September 14, 2019 and re-signed to the practice squad.

Chicago Bears
On November 30, 2019, Levin was signed by the Chicago Bears off the Broncos practice squad. He was waived on September 3, 2020.

New England Patriots
On September 9, 2020, Levin was signed to the New England Patriots practice squad, but was released two days later.

New York Jets
On April 8, 2021, Levin was signed by the New York Jets. He was waived on August 31.

Tennessee Titans (second stint)
On September 1, 2021, the Tennessee Titans claimed Levin off waivers, reuniting him with the team that drafted him in 2017. He was released on September 6 and re-signed to the practice squad. He was promoted to the active roster on October 8, 2021. He appeared in a Week 5 victory over the Jacksonville Jaguars, his first appearance since 2018.

On March 21, 2022, Levin was waived by Tennessee.

References

External links
 Chattanooga Mocs bio
 

1994 births
Living people
People from Dacula, Georgia
Sportspeople from the Atlanta metropolitan area
Players of American football from Georgia (U.S. state)
American football offensive guards
Chattanooga Mocs football players
Tennessee Titans players
Denver Broncos players
Chicago Bears players
New England Patriots players
New York Jets players